Manuel Rodríguez is a Chilean telenovela broadcast in Chilevisión, based on the Chilean guerrilla Manuel Rodríguez Erdoiza. It was first aired on March 15, 2010.

Cast 
 Ricardo Fernández as Manuel Rodríguez
 Sofía García as Francisca de Paula Segura y Ruiz
 Cristián Carvajal as Vicente San Bruno
 Alfredo Castro as Francisco Casimiro Marcó del Pont
 Catalina Pulido as Paula de Salas y Velasco
 Willy Semler as Mateo Segura y Ruiz
 Tiago Correa as José Miguel Neira
 Mariana Loyola as Micaela / Mercedes Larraín Fernández de León
 Javiera Hernández as Josefa Egaña
 Luz Jiménez as María Loreto Erdoíza y Aguirre
 José Soza as Obispo José Santiago Rodríguez Zorrila
 Helen Cáceres as Leonor Olivares da Silva
 Antonio Campos as José Joaquín Guzmán
 Paloma Moreno as Catalina Larraín de Salas
 Santiago Tupper as Mariano Segura y Ruiz
 Francisco Medina as Fraile Bernardo Larraín Fernández de León
 Roxana Campos as Tomasa Araya
 Rodrigo Pérez as Cayetano Chávez
 Carmen Gloria Bresky as Tadea
 Nathalia Aragonese as Pascuala
 Roberto Farías as Sargento Villalobos
 Ángela Gederlini Massa as Corita
 Juan Pablo Ogalde as Eusebio
 Claudio Castellón as Magno Pérez
 Diego Ruíz as Borja de Sotomayor
 Nicolás Carreño as Ignacio Larraín de Salas
 Carlos Marin as Jacinto
 Ernesto Gutiérrez as "El Negro"
 Felipe Ponce as Segundo

Special guests 

 Rolando Valenzuela as Bernardo O’Higgins
 Paulo Brunetti as José de San Martín
 Natalia Grez as Carmen Díaz de Valdés
 Maité Fernández as Madre Superiora Dolores

See also 
 Feroz
 Martín Rivas

External links 
 Official website 

Chilean telenovelas
2010 telenovelas
2010 Chilean television series debuts
2010 Chilean television series endings
Chilevisión telenovelas
Spanish-language telenovelas